During the Soviet–Japanese War in August 1945, the Soviet Union made plans to invade Hokkaido, the northernmost of Japan's four main home islands. Opposition from the United States and doubts within the Soviet high command caused the plans to be cancelled before the invasion could begin.

Background 
In the last days of World War II, the Soviet Union declared war on Japan (August 9), as Joseph Stalin secretly agreed at Tehran and Yalta. The Soviet declaration of war was a major factor for the surrender of Japan on August 15. Although all other Allies, including the United States, ceased all hostilities upon the surrender, Stalin ordered his troops to continue fighting to capture more Japanese territory and put the Soviets in a stronger bargaining position to occupy Japan.

The Red Army successfully conquered the southern half of Sakhalin Island. The island had been contested between Japan and Russia for a century and fought over during the Russo-Japanese War of 1905, and by 1945, it had been divided between the two countries (the Japanese southern half was called Karafuto Prefecture). The Soviets then captured the Kuril Islands starting on August 18, three days after the Japanese surrender.

While they planned the conquests of Sakhalin and the Kurils, the Soviets considered it necessary to control Hokkaido (or at least the parts of Hokkaido bordering the Sea of Okhotsk) to secure their new territories. However, the Potsdam Declaration of the previous month set out that postwar Japan would control its four main home islands of Hokkaido, Honshu, Kyushu, and Shikoku. Therefore, a Soviet annexation or even occupation of Hokkaido would have likely provoked heated opposition from the other Allies.

Proposed battle plans 
Marshal of the Soviet Union Aleksandr Vasilevsky envisioned taking the northern half of Hokkaido by landing at the small, remote port of Rumoi and occupying everything north of a line from Rumoi to Kushiro. Two rifle divisions of the 87th Rifle Corps were to be used. Air and sea units were also sent to Sakhalin to support the invasion. Even with American ships lent to the Soviets during Project Hula, the Soviet Navy did not have enough transport space to carry both divisions from Sakhalin in one lift and so it planned to make two trips. Admiral Ivan Yumashev planned to start the Rumoi landing at 05:00 on August 24.

The Soviet high command dictated that although logistical preparations should go forward, the invasion should not begin without explicit authorization from headquarters.

Cancellation 
US President Harry Truman was willing to accept the Soviet annexation of Sakhalin and the Kuril Islands, which remained part of the Soviet Union after the war, but he staunchly opposed any Soviet escapade on Hokkaido. The Potsdam Declaration intended that all of the Japanese home islands be surrendered to US General Douglas MacArthur, rather than to the Soviets, and so Truman refused to allow the Soviets to participate in the occupation of Japan. Furthermore, concerns were raised within the Soviet high command that an invasion of Hokkaido would be impractical and unlikely to succeed and would violate the Yalta Agreement.

The invasion was cancelled on August 22, two days before their scheduled start, and Soviet forces concentrated on taking the Kuril Islands instead.

Historical analysis 
Historians have generally considered it unlikely that an invasion of Hokkaido would have succeeded. Factors include the small number of Soviet transport ships, the small number of Soviet ground forces planned for the invasion, and the availability of Japanese air power including kamikaze planes to contest a Soviet landing. Soviet forces suffered heavy losses in the Battle of Shumshu during the invasion of the Kuril Islands, and historians foresaw similar problems plaguing an invasion of Hokkaido.

Historian Dennis Giangreco believes that the Japanese forces would have fiercely fought back against an attack after their country had surrendered, and the small, hastily-assembled Soviet forces would have been unable to hold out against them. Because the Soviets thought the Japanese would not contest a landing after they had already surrendered, they assembled a relatively small force of two divisions, much smaller than the four field armies, totaling about 12 divisions, which Marshal Georgy Zhukov estimated would be necessary for a full-scale conquest. However, after the Japanese fiercely defended Shumshu three days after the surrender, the Soviets were forced to reconsider this assumption.

Richard B. Frank, however, believes that despite serious Soviet deficiencies in shipping capacity and air cover, the Soviets could have succeeded because Japanese defenses were concentrated in the south to face the Americans, rather than the north to face the Soviets.

See also 
 Soviet invasion of South Sakhalin
 Invasion of the Kuril Islands
 Japanese evacuation of Karafuto and the Kuril Islands
 Operation Downfall, the American-led plans to invade Japan
 Proposed Japanese invasion of Australia during World War II

References

External links 
  Communications between Soviet officers and between Truman and Stalin regarding the Hokkaido invasion plans, provided by the Wilson Center

Cancelled military operations of World War II
Cancelled invasions
Japan campaign
Hokkaido
Japan–Soviet Union relations
1945 in Japan
1945 in the Soviet Union
Conflicts in 1945
Invasions by the Soviet Union
Amphibious operations of World War II
August 1945 events in Asia